Universal Music Group released The Best of Siouxsie and the Banshees in 2002 as the first reissue of the Siouxsie and the Banshees remastered back-catalogue. The most successful singles of the band were presented in a non-chronological order.

Content 

This best-of includes an unreleased track "Dizzy" (re-edited), only available on this CD; it was recorded in late 1994. The original version of "Dizzy" was included on a one track CD sold at the Seven Year Itch concerts of 2002. "Dizzy" would later feature in the film Notes on a Scandal.

The Best of also includes for the first time the complete version of "This Wheel's on Fire" with no fade out in the end. Also, The Mark Saunders Mix of "Stargazer" was used instead of the original album version. All except for two of the tracks had previously been included on Once Upon a Time/The Singles and Twice Upon a Time - The Singles, although there were some minor differences in song versions on this collection.

The double CD edition also contains many remixes and an unreleased extended version of a non-album single from 1987, "Song from the Edge of the World". The bonus DVD includes music videos for all the featured songs on the main disc excluding "Dizzy".

Release and reception 

The Best of Siouxsie and the Banshees was released on 12 November 2002. It was issued in three editions; single disc, double CD and Sound & Vision double CD + DVD (the latter version was released in 2004 and re-issued on 1 October 2007).

Singer Spoek Mathambo selected the compilation in his 12 "favourite albums", explaining he discovered it during his formative years. "My friend gave me the Best Of album, and through college I just listened to it a lot: 'Israel', 'Dear Prudence', 'Hong Kong Garden', 'Peek-a-Boo'. [...] Siouxsie, for me, was very easy to listen to. Plus, the songs are super hooky".

Upon its release, Billboard reviewed the compilation as "adventurous, sumptuous, and contagious pop".

Track listing

Disc one
 "Dear Prudence" (1983)
 "Hong Kong Garden" (1978)
 "Cities in Dust" (1985)
 "Peek-a-Boo" (1988)
 "Happy House" (1980)
 "Kiss Them for Me" (1991)
 "Face to Face" (1992)
 "Dizzy" (1995)
 "Israel" (1980)
 "Christine" (1980)
 "Spellbound" (1981)
 "Stargazer" (1995)
 "Arabian Knights" (1981)
 "The Killing Jar" (1988)
 "This Wheel's on Fire" (1987)

Disc two
 "Spellbound" (extended 12" #2 version)
 "Song from the Edge of the World" (Columbus mix)
 "Kiss Them for Me" (Kathak #2 mix)
 "Peek-a-Boo" (Silver Dollar mix)
 "The Killing Jar" (Lepidopteristic mix)
 "Cities in Dust" (Eruption mix)
 "Dazzle" (Glamour mix)
 "Stargazer" (Mambo Sun remix)
 "Face to Face" (Catatonic mix)

DVD
 "Dear Prudence"
 "Hong Kong Garden"
 "Cities in Dust"
 "Peek-a-Boo"
 "Happy House"
 "Kiss Them for Me"
 "Face to Face"
 "Israel"
 "Christine"
 "Spellbound"
 "Stargazer"
 "Arabian Knights"
 "The Killing Jar"
 "This Wheel's on Fire"
A 2 cd + 1 dvd Deluxe : sound & vision edition was released in June 2004 in a long box. It was re-issued in a digipack format in October 2007.

References 

Best of Siouxsie and the Banshees, The
2002 video albums
Music video compilation albums
Best of Siouxsie and the Banshees, The
Polydor Records compilation albums
Geffen Records compilation albums
Polydor Records video albums